Greg Wells (born 6 June 1950) is a former Australian rules footballer who played with Melbourne and Carlton in the Victorian Football League (VFL) during the 1970s and early 1980s.

Wells usually played as a centreman or rover. During the 1969 season Wells played in the thirds, seconds and senior Melbourne sides in successive weeks. He finished runner-up in the 1972 Brownlow Medal and equal fourth in 1976. Wells also won Melbourne's best and fairest award in both 1971 and 1976.

The 1980 season was his last for Melbourne and he crossed mid year to Carlton where he attempted to finish his career with a premiership. He was a member of Carlton's 1981 premiership side.

In 1983, he moved to the reformed Moorabbin Football Club in the Victorian Football Association (VFA) second division, serving as the inaugural VFA captain of the 1980s incarnation of the club.

Playing statistics

|- style="background-color: #EAEAEA"
! scope="row" style="text-align:center" | 1969
|style="text-align:center;"|
| 50 || 3 || 10 || 4 || 51 || 13 || 64 || 10 ||  || 3.3 || 1.3 || 17.0 || 4.3 || 21.3 || 3.3 || 
|-
! scope="row" style="text-align:center" | 1970
|style="text-align:center;"|
| 11 || 20 || 19 || 25 || 267 || 50 || 317 || 52 ||  || 1.0 || 1.3 || 13.4 || 2.5 || 15.9 || 2.6 || 
|- style="background:#eaeaea;"
! scope="row" style="text-align:center" | 1971
|style="text-align:center;"|
| 11 || 18 || 11 || 17 || 316 || 38 || 354 || 89 || || 0.6 || 0.9 || 17.6 || 2.1 || 19.7 || 4.9 || 
|-
! scope="row" style="text-align:center" | 1972
|style="text-align:center;"|
| 11 || 22 || 34 || 29 || 444 || 52 || 496 || 114 ||  || 1.5 || 1.3 || 20.2 || 2.4 || 22.5 || 5.2 || 
|- style="background:#eaeaea;"
! scope="row" style="text-align:center" | 1973
|style="text-align:center;"|
| 11 || 21 || 20 || 39 || 459 || 77 || 536 || 113 ||  || 1.0 || 1.9 || 21.9 || 3.7 || 25.5 || 5.4 || 
|-
! scope="row" style="text-align:center" | 1974
|style="text-align:center;"|
| 11 || 22 || 26 || 30 || 474 || 91 || 565 || 97 ||  || 1.2 || 1.4 || 21.5 || 4.1 || 25.7 || 4.4 || 
|- style="background:#eaeaea;"
! scope="row" style="text-align:center" | 1975
|style="text-align:center;"|
| 11 || 21 || 32 || 33 || 388 || 70 || 458 || 81 ||  || 1.5 || 1.7 || 19.4 || 3.5 || 22.9 || 4.0 || 
|-
! scope="row" style="text-align:center" | 1976
|style="text-align:center;"|
| 11 || 22 || 31 || 29 || 477 || 107 || 584 || 105 ||  || 1.4 || 1.3 || 21.7 || 4.9 || 26.5 || 4.8 || 
|- style="background:#eaeaea;"
! scope="row" style="text-align:center" | 1977
|style="text-align:center;"|
| 11 || 21 || 23 || 19 || 416 || 93 || 509 || 94 ||  || 1.1 || 1.0 || 19.8 || 4.4 || 24.2 || 4.5 || 
|-
! scope="row" style="text-align:center" | 1978
|style="text-align:center;"|
| 11 || 20 || 17 || 26 || 374 || 120 || 494 || 121 ||  || 0.9 || 1.4 || 18.7 || 6.0 || 24.7 || 6.1 || 
|- style="background:#eaeaea;"
! scope="row" style="text-align:center" | 1979
|style="text-align:center;"|
| 11 || 22 || 24 || 39 || 412 || 132 || 544 || 133 ||  || 1.1 || 1.8 || 18.7 || 6.0 || 24.7 || 6.0 || 
|-
! scope="row" style="text-align:center" | 1980
|style="text-align:center;"|
| 11 || 12 || 4 || 6 || 202 || 99 || 301 || 60 ||  || 0.3 || 0.5 || 16.8 || 8.3 || 25.1 || 5.0 || 
|- style="background:#eaeaea;"
! scope="row" style="text-align:center" | 1980
|style="text-align:center;"|
| 11 || 10 || 9 || 11 || 175 || 84 || 259 || 61 ||  || 0.9 || 1.1 || 17.5 || 8.4 || 25.9 || 6.1 || 
|-
! scope="row" style="text-align:center" | 1981
|style="text-align:center;"|
| 1 || 22 || 13 || 14 || 309 || 111 || 420 || 77 ||  || 0.6 || 0.6 || 14.0 || 5.0 || 19.1 || 3.5 || 
|- style="background:#eaeaea;"
! scope="row" style="text-align:center" | 1982
|style="text-align:center;"|
| 1 || 11 || 2 || 10 || 126 || 44 || 270 || 31 ||  || 0.2 || 0.9 || 11.5 || 4.0 || 15.5 || 2.8 || 
|- class="sortbottom"
! colspan=3| Career
! 267
! 275
! 331
! 4890
! 1181
! 6071
! 1238
! 
! 1.0
! 1.3
! 18.4
! 4.4
! 22.8
! 4.7
! 
|}

References

External links

Demonwiki profile

1950 births
Living people
Australian rules footballers from Victoria (Australia)
Melbourne Football Club players
Carlton Football Club players
Carlton Football Club Premiership players
Keith 'Bluey' Truscott Trophy winners
Melbourne Football Club captains
Moorabbin Football Club players
One-time VFL/AFL Premiership players